Scoparia absconditalis is a moth in the family Crambidae. It was described by Hugo Theodor Christoph in 1887. It is found in the north-western Caucasus.

References

Moths described in 1887
Scorparia